The Happiest Girl in the World is a musical with a book by Fred Saidy and Henry Mayers, lyrics by E.Y. Harburg, and music taken from the works of Jacques Offenbach.

Based on the comedy Lysistrata by Aristophanes and tales of Greek mythology by Thomas Bulfinch, it focuses on the women of Ancient Greece and Sparta who, inspired by virginal goddess Diana, vow to withhold sex from their husbands and lovers until they promise to put an end to their fighting. Complications ensue when Diana's uncle and underworld ruler Pluto balks at the notion of peace and attempts to derail her plan.

The Broadway production, directed by Cyril Ritchard and choreographed by Dania Krupska, opened on April 3, 1961 at the Martin Beck Theatre, where it ran for 98 performances. The cast included Ritchard in multiple roles (most notably that of Pluto), Janice Rule as Diana, and Lainie Kazan, David Canary, Ted Thurston, and Bruce Yarnell in supporting roles. 

Krupska was nominated for the Tony Award for Best Choreography and Yarnell won the Theatre World Award for his performance.

An original cast recording was released by Columbia Records.

Musical numbers
Source:Guide to Musical Theatre

Act I
Cheers for the Hero
The Glory That is Greece
The Happiest Girl in the World
The Greek Marine
Shall We Say Farewell
Never Be-Devil the Devil
Whatever They May Be
Eureka
The Oath
The Happiest Girl in the World (Reprise)
Diana's Transformation
Vive La Virtue!
Adrift on a Star
The Happiest Girl in the World (Reprise)
Act One Finale

Act II
That'll Be the Day
How Soon, Oh Moon?
Love-Sick Serenade
Five Minutes of Spring
The Greek Marine (Reprise)
Five Minutes of Spring (Reprise)
Never Trust a Virgin
Entrance of the Courtesans
The Pied Piper's Can-Can
Vive La Virtue! (Reprise)
Finale

References

External links

 

1961 musicals
Broadway musicals
Works based on Lysistrata